Milad Jafari (born 11 July 1989 in) is an Iranian footballer who currently plays for the Persian Gulf Pro League side Esteghlal Ahvaz.

Club career

Naft Gachsaran
Milad debuted for Naft Gachsaran in a game against Parseh Tehran. He played 17 games in the Azadegan League for Naft Gachsaran.

Naft Masjed Soleyman
Milad signed a one-year deal with Naft Masjed Soleyman on 5 January 2014.

References
 
 naftmis.ir (فارسی)

1989 births
Iranian footballers
Living people
People from Bojnord
Association football midfielders
Naft Masjed Soleyman F.C. players
Zagros Yasuj F.C. players